, provisional designation , is a trans-Neptunian object of the scattered disc orbiting in the outermost region of the Solar System.

It is not a detached object, since its perihelion (closest approach to the Sun) is under the influence of Neptune. Light-curve-amplitude analysis suggests that it is a spheroid. Tancredi presents "in the form of a decision tree, the set of questions to be considered in order to classify an object as an icy 'dwarf planet'." They find that  is very probably a dwarf planet.

Discovery 

Discovered in 1996 by David C. Jewitt et al., it was the first object to be categorized as a scattered-disk object (SDO), although , discovered a year earlier, was later recognised as a scattered-disk object. It was considered one the largest known trans-Neptunian objects at the time of the discovery, being placed second after Pluto. It came to perihelion in 2001.

Orbit and size 

 orbits the Sun with a semi-major axis of 83.9 AU but is currently only 35 AU from the Sun with an apparent magnitude of 21. More-recent measurements in 2012 by the 'TNOs are Cool' research project and reanalysis of older data have resulted in a new estimate of these figures. Light-curve-amplitude analysis shows only small deviations, suggesting  is a spheroid with small albedo spots and may be a dwarf planet.

References

External links 
  – A New Type of Transneptunian Object, MPC news release
  – A Newly Discovered Planetesimal
 Our Solar System Is Getting Crowded, Science Magazine
  – A New Dynamical Class in the Outer Solar System, David Jewitt's Kuiper Belt website
 Lists and Plots: Minor Planets
 

015874
Discoveries by Chad Trujillo
Discoveries by David C. Jewitt
Discoveries by Jane Luu
Discoveries by Jun Chen (astronomer)
015874
19961009